Emmanuel Acheampong was a Ghanaian politician. He served as a Member of Parliament for the Gomoa East constituency in Central Region of Ghana.

Early life and education

Political career 
Emmanuel Acheampong is a member of the 3rd parliament of the 4th republic of Ghana who took his seat during the 2000 Ghanaian general election on the ticket of the New Patriotic Party with a majority of 568 votes. He polled a total of 10,900 votes which represented 47.60% of the total votes cast. His opponents; Richard Annan of the National Democratic Congress (NDC) had 10,332 votes, Michael L.K. Amoah of the Convention People's Party had 792 votes which is 3.50% of the total votes cast. As if these two were not enough, James Kuaw Buafi of the National Reform Party (NRP), Kwame Ebure of the United Ghana Movement (UGM) and Sam Ken Mensah of the People's National Convention (PNC) had 2.20%, 1.00% and 0.00% respectively of the total votes cast.  He took the seat from Thomas Kweku Aubyn of National Democratic Congress. He lost the seat in 2004 to Richard Sam Quarm of New Patriotic Party.

Religion 
Emmanuel Acheampong was a Christian.

Death 
He died on February 9, 2003, together with the Gomoa East NPP chairman Isaac Kofi Yomo Laryea Quarshie in a motor accident on the Swedru/Winneba road.

References 

Ghanaian MPs 2001–2005
New Patriotic Party politicians
2003 deaths
Year of birth missing